The gay wage gap is the pay gap between homosexuals and heterosexuals. Studies have shown that gay men, when including the unemployed, but not when excluding them, earn less than their heterosexual counterparts, whereas lesbians earn more ("lesbian wage premium"). This open discrimination is well documented in both gay friendly countries as well as those that openly discriminate against gay men (e.g. China and Saudi Arabia). People who are openly lesbian, gay, bisexual, and/or transgender experience socioeconomic disadvantages.

Phenomenon 
Full-time employed Gay men earn, on average, 10 percent more than straight men.
 Kirk Snyder, professor at the USC business-school, noted that gay people are better entrepreneurs. Gay managers have a 25% higher level of employee engagement. The National Transgender Discrimination Survey reported, that trans people are up to four times as likely to earn less than $10,000 and twice as likely to be unemployed due to discrimination. In the 2013–2015 National Health Surveys analysed by Christopher Carpenter and Samuel Eppink, they found that gay, full-time employed men made, on average, 10% more than similarly employed straight men even when controlling for various other factors.

Wage discrimination by country

Germany 
Taking into account age, education, and industry, gay men earn less than heterosexuals even though they tend to be better educated than the average population.

Australia 
An Australian study has shown that gay men earn 13% less than their straight counterparts. Meanwhile, lesbians earn 13% more than straight women. La Nauze, economist at University of Melbourne, noted: "There are grounds for concern that workers in Australia, particularly gay men, are discriminated against because of their sexual orientation."

United States 
A study of the 2013–15 National Health Interview Surveys found that gay, full-time employed men made, on average, 10% more than similarly employed straight men. The same study showed that lesbians received a pay premium of 9%. Bisexual men and women earned less than both gay and straight counterparts.

Wage discrimination by orientation

Lesbian women 

Lesbian women make a median of 1.4% more than heterosexual women, but make 25.6% less than heterosexual men. Women who are between the ages of 18 and 44, 29% of bisexual women and 23% of lesbian women are experiencing poverty, compared to 21% of heterosexual women. Lesbian couples tend to experience higher poverty rates while earning similarly the same as straight women. This is largely due to the discrimination and homophobia that homosexual women face that their heterosexual counterparts do not. But, lesbians still earn less than the regular household income of a heterosexual couple because of the gender wage gap. As a result, lesbian couples/households are more likely to live in poverty than heterosexual couples/households. Thus, gay women in relationships are disadvantaged because their income is totally composed of women's salaries.

Men earn more than women in most occupations, and this inequality plays out regardless of sexual orientation. In fact, in Badgett's 2009 review, some studies showed that while lesbians earned more than heterosexual women, they made less than straight and gay men.

"In the case of lesbian women, they are compared to heterosexual women, who are really the lowest paid people," says Badgett. Meanwhile, the earnings of gay men were compared to straight men, who are, on average, paid the most. 

Even when lesbians do get hired they are far more likely to face workplace harassment and bullying. In America, a study from UCLA's Williams Institute found up to 41 percent of LGBT+ employees had been "verbally or physically abused or had their workplace vandalized." While 1 in 6 had reported that their sexual orientation stood in the way of career advancement, or lead to them being let go.

Gay men 

Until recently it was thought that gay men made a median of 18.4% less than compared to straight men. A recent study has showed that in the US full-time employed Gay men now earn 10% more than their heterosexual counterparts.  20% of gay men and 25% of bisexual men between the ages of 18 and 44 live in or below the poverty level, compared to 15% of heterosexual men.

Transgender individuals 

Transgender adults are nearly 4 times as likely to have a household income of under $10,000 per year.

See also

Sources 

Income distribution
Equal pay for equal work
Economic inequality
Homophobia
LGBT and society